As of February 2023, Alliance Air flies to the following 72 destinations.

List

See also
 Air India destinations
 Air India Express destinations

Notes

References

Alliance Air